Adnan Kaddour (born 1 March 1971) is a Syrian boxer. He competed in the 1996 Summer Olympics.

References

1971 births
Living people
Boxers at the 1996 Summer Olympics
Syrian male boxers
Olympic boxers of Syria
Boxers at the 1994 Asian Games
Asian Games competitors for Syria
Light-heavyweight boxers
20th-century Syrian people